Silver Creek Village is an unincorporated community in Burnet County, Texas, United States. According to the Handbook of Texas, the community had an estimated population of 250 in 2000.

History
The area in what is known as Silver Creek Village today was first settled in 1959 and appeared on maps that next year. There was a Baptist church established in the 1970s. Its population was 250 in 2000 and is now a popular tourist destination.

Geography

Education
Silver Creek Village is served by the Burnet Consolidated Independent School District.

References

Unincorporated communities in Burnet County, Texas
Unincorporated communities in Texas